

Political debut
Thaksin Shinawatra entered politics in late 1994 at the invitation of Chamlong Srimuang, who had just reclaimed the position of Palang Dharma Party (PDP) leader from Boonchu Rojanastien. In a subsequent purge of Boonchu-affiliated PDP cabinet ministers, Thaksin was appointed foreign minister in December 1994, replacing Prasong Soonsiri.

The PDP soon withdrew from the government over the Sor Por Kor 4-01 land reform corruption scandal, causing the government of Chuan Leekpai to collapse.

PDP leader and Deputy Prime Minister in the Banharn government
Chamlong, strongly criticized for mishandling internal PDP politics in the last days of the Chuan-government, retired from politics and hand-picked Thaksin as new PDP leader. Thaksin ran for election for the first time in July 1995, winning a parliamentary seat from Bangkok. However, the weakened and internally divided PDP won only 23 seats, compared to 46 in the 1992 elections.

Thaksin joined the government of Banharn Silpa-acha and was appointed deputy prime minister in charge of Bangkok traffic. In May 1996, Thaksin and four other PDP ministers quit the Banharn cabinet (while retaining their MP seats) to protest widespread allegations of corruption, prompting a cabinet reshuffle. Many have claimed that Thaksin's move was designed to help give Chamlong Srimuang a boost in the June 1996 Bangkok Governor elections, which Chamlong returned from retirement to contest.  Chamlong lost the election. He and incumbent governor, former PDP-member Krisda Arunwongse na Ayudhya, were defeated by Pichit Rattakul, an independent.

Chamlong's failure to buttress the PDP's failing power base in Bangkok amplified internal divisions in the PDP, particularly between Chamlong's "temple" faction and Thaksin's faction.  Soon afterwards, Chamlong announced he was retiring again from politics.

Thaksin and the PDP pulled out of the Banharn-government in August 1996. In a subsequent no-confidence debate, the PDP gave evidence against the Banharn government. Soon afterwards, Banharn dissolved parliament in September 1996.

Fall of the PDP
Thaksin announced that he would not run in the subsequent November 1996 elections, but would remain as leader of the PDP.  He claimed that he wanted to devote his energies to campaigning for political reform and supporting other PDP candidates. Some speculated that Thaksin wanted to resign from the party leadership. The PDP suffered a fatal defeat in the elections, winning only 1 seat in parliament. The PDP soon imploded, with most members resigning.  However, the PDP is still in existence, with a different leadership and an insignificant presence in the political sphere.

Although there was much controversy about the root causes of the fall of the PDP, most agree that it was due to internal divisions in the party.  Particularly divisive were conflicts between the Chamlong "temple" faction and subsequent generations of outsiders, including Thaksin.

Deputy Prime Minister in the Chavalit government
On 15 August 1997, Thaksin was invited to become Deputy Prime Minister in Chavalit Yongchaiyudh's government. This occurred soon after the Thai baht was floated and devalued on 2 July 1997, sparking the Asian Financial Crisis. Thaksin held this position for only 3 months, leaving on November 14 after Chavalit resigned.

During an unsuccessful censure debate on 27 September 1997, Democrat Suthep Thaugsuban accused Thaksin of profiting on insider information about the government's decision to float the baht. However, this accusation was not investigated during the subsequent Democrat or TRT governments. During 1997, Thaksin's flagship company, AIS, suffered 1.8 billion baht in foreign exchange losses and saw its debt more than double due to the devaluation. However, critics have alleged that Thaksin's businesses suffered much less from the devaluation than rival companies.

Formation of the Thai Rak Thai Party and the 2001 elections
Thaksin founded the Thai Rak Thai (TRT) ("Thais Love Thais") party in 1998 along with Somkid Jatusripitak, PDP ally Sudarat Keyuraphan, Purachai Piumsombun, and 19 others.

With a populist platform often attributed to Somkid, TRT promised universal access to healthcare, a 3-year debt moratorium for farmers, and one million baht locally managed development funds for all Thai villages.

After Prime Minister Chuan dissolved parliament in November 2000, TRT won a sweeping victory in the January 2001 elections, the first election held under the People's Constitution of 1997. It was called the most open, corruption-free election in Thai history. Thai Rak Thai won 248 parliamentary seats (more than any other party previously) and needed only 3 more seats to form a government. Nonetheless, Thaksin opted for a broad coalition with the Chart Thai Party (41 seats) and the New Aspiration Party (36 seats), while absorbing the smaller Seritham Party (14 seats).

References

Thaksin Shinawatra
Political history of Thailand